Handball at the Friendship Games is the handball tournament organized for the 1984 Summer Olympics boycotting countries. Given that the Eastern Bloc countries and allies were at that time amongst the most competitive teams the tournament's level was rather high.

It was contested in two events. Men's event took place in Rostock and Magdeburg, East Germany between 17 and 21 July 1984, with eight teams competing. The women's event was contested at Hala na Sihoti in Trenčín, Czechoslovakia between 21 and 25 August 1984, with six teams competing.

Men's event
Eight teams were drawn into two groups.

The host nation, East Germany, had two teams in the tournament. However, the East Germany "B" team competed "off competition". Despite ending the tournament on the sixth place, this result was not included in the final rankings. The seventh team (i. e. Czechoslovakia) was instead counted as the sixth place team, etc.

Group A
All matches played in Magdeburg.

Results

Group B
All matches played in Rostock.

Results

Final round

Classification 5th–8th

Final ranking

* – East Germany B competed "off competition" and was not included in the final ranking table.

Top scorer

  – 26 goals

Women's event
Six teams competed in a round-robin tournament.

Results

Winning teams' squads

Medal table

See also
 Handball at the 1984 Summer Olympics

Notes

References

Friendship Games
Friendship Games
1984 in Czechoslovak sport
1984 in East German sport
Friendship Games